The Block is a 1954 painting by Australian artist John Brack. The painting depicts the interior of an empty butcher's shop, including the eponymous butcher's block. It is one of a series of paintingsincluding The Barber's Shop (1952), The Fish Shop (1955)  and Men's Wear (1955)of small high street businesses.

Brack's works, including The Block, were often considered to be satire of 1950s and 60s Australia. However, Helen Maudsley (Brack's wife) claims that Brack intended the work to be a commentary on the Holocaust.

The painting was first exhibited in February 1954 at the Peter Bray Gallery in Melbourne. It was purchased by Colonel Aubrey Gibson, later a trustee of the National Gallery of Victoria (NGV). It was exhibited at the NGV in 1969 as part of the Aubrey Gibson collection. It was later included in two John Brack retrospective exhibitionsat the NGV in 1987 and at the National Gallery of Australia in Canberra in 1999.

The work was acquired by the National Gallery of Victoria, through the Art Foundation of Victoria by Dr Joseph Brown, in 1999.

References

External links
The Block - National Gallery of Victoria collection.

Paintings by John Brack
1954 paintings
Paintings in the collection of the National Gallery of Victoria